Roberto Rudi (born 13 April 1987) is an Italian footballer that plays as a defender.

Career statistics

Notes

References

External links

1987 births
Living people
Italian footballers
Association football defenders
Como 1907 players
Aurora Pro Patria 1919 players
Calcio Lecco 1912 players
S.S.D. Varese Calcio players
F.C. Pavia players
Serie D players
Serie C players
Universiade silver medalists for Italy
Universiade medalists in football
Medalists at the 2009 Summer Universiade
S.C. Caronnese S.S.D. players